Nikolaos Syllas (30 November 1914 – 16 August 1986) was a Greek athlete who competed in the 1936 Summer Olympics, in the 1948 Summer Olympics, and in the 1952 Summer Olympics. He was born in Chios. At the 1952 edition he was flag bearer for Greece.

Outside the Olympics he was a silver medallist at the 1951 Mediterranean Games behind Italy's Giuseppe Tosi (an Olympic medallist). He was also a three-time participant for Greece at the European Athletics Championships, competing 1934, 1946 and 1950.

References

1914 births
1986 deaths
Greek male discus throwers
Olympic athletes of Greece
Athletes (track and field) at the 1936 Summer Olympics
Athletes (track and field) at the 1948 Summer Olympics
Athletes (track and field) at the 1952 Summer Olympics
Sportspeople from Chios
Mediterranean Games silver medalists for Greece
Mediterranean Games medalists in athletics
Athletes (track and field) at the 1951 Mediterranean Games
20th-century Greek people